Ascorbate 2,3-dioxygenase is an enzyme that catalyzes the chemical reaction

ascorbate + O2 + H2O  oxalate + threonate

The 3 substrates of this enzyme are ascorbate, oxygen, and water, whereas its two products are oxalate and threonate.

This enzyme belongs to the family of oxidoreductases, specifically those acting on single donors with O2 as oxidant and incorporation of two atoms of oxygen into the substrate (oxygenases). The oxygen incorporated need not be derived from O2.  The systematic name of this enzyme class is ascorbate:oxygen 2,3-oxidoreductase (bond-cleaving). This enzyme is also called AAoxygenase.  This enzyme participates in ascorbate and aldarate metabolism.  It employs one cofactor, iron.

References

 

EC 1.13.11
Iron enzymes
Enzymes of unknown structure